Count Robert Henrik Rehbinder (15 July 1777 – 8 March 1841) served as the Secretary of State for the Grand Duchy of Finland between 1811 and 1841. One of the highest officials in the Grand Duchy, he played a significant part in establishing the autonomous role of Finland at the Diet of Porvoo in 1809.

Biography
Born in Paimio, Rehbinder was given the title count in 1826, and in 1834 he was given the title Privy Counsellor. He was also awarded with the second highest Russian honor and given an honorary doctorship in philosophy at the University of Helsinki in 1840, at the 200 year jubilee of the University (originally Royal Academy of Turku). He also owned the Viksberg castle in Paimio.  He died in Saint Petersburg.

Three streets in Helsinki have been named after him: Stora Robertsgatan (Iso Roobertinkatu) in Punavuori, Lilla Robertsgatan (Pieni Roobertinkatu) in Kaartinkaupunki and Rehbindersvägen (Rehbinderintie) in Eira. Furthermore, the current southern part of the Mannerheimintie street was until 1942 named after him (Heikinkatu or Henriksgatan in Swedish). He was portrayed on a stamp in Finland in 1936.

References

External links 
 Rehbinder, Robert Henrik in Biografiskt lexikon för Finland.
 Helsingin Sanomat, 18 December 2005.
 Ylioppilasmatrikkeli

1777 births
1841 deaths
19th-century Finnish nobility
People from Paimio
Robert Henrik
Finnish people of Baltic German descent